John Kelly (born 20 October 1960) is a former professional footballer who played in the Football League as a midfielder for Tranmere Rovers, Preston North End, Chester City, Swindon Town, Oldham Athletic, Walsall and Huddersfield Town.

The son of former Tranmere Rovers manager Noel Kelly, John established himself as a stylish midfielder in the lower divisions after joining Tranmere from neighbours Cammell Laird in September 1979. In 1985–86 he struck up a successful partnership with fellow new signing Milton Graham at Chester City, with Kelly scoring eight times as Chester were promoted from Division Four. A year later he moved up to the second tier with Swindon Town for £20,000, although he struggled to establish himself with the Wiltshire club and soon moved on to Oldham Athletic.

After spells with Walsall and Huddersfield Town, Kelly returned to Chester in the summer of 1992. Unfortunately, the 1992–93 season brought relegation to Division Three and Kelly was released at the end of the campaign. This marked the end of his professional career and he went part-time by joining Welsh side Rhyl.

Kelly made two appearances for the Republic of Ireland U21s, a nation he was eligible to represent as his father was born in Ireland.

Honours
Chester City
Division Four runners-up: 1985–86

References

External links
 John Kelly at Post War English & Scottish Football League A–Z Player's Transfer Database

1960 births
Living people
People from Bebington
Association football midfielders
English footballers
Republic of Ireland under-21 international footballers
Republic of Ireland association footballers
Cammell Laird 1907 F.C. players
Tranmere Rovers F.C. players
Preston North End F.C. players
Chester City F.C. players
Swindon Town F.C. players
Walsall F.C. players
Oldham Athletic A.F.C. players
Huddersfield Town A.F.C. players
Rhyl F.C. players
English Football League players
English people of Irish descent